The Richardson Building is a 34-storey office tower at the intersection of Portage and Main in Winnipeg, Manitoba, Canada. The building forms the anchor of the Lombard Place development, and is connected to Winnipeg Square shopping mall via the Portage and Main Concourse. The thirty-four storey building stands 124 metres tall (407 ft), making it the (behind 201 Portage and 300 main) third tallest building in Winnipeg. It is dressed in granite chip pre-cast concrete and solar bronze double-glazed glass.

Construction

The current Richardson building is the second attempt at building a headquarters for James Richardson & Sons, Limited at Portage and Main. The original building was planned to stand 17 storeys tall and cost $3 million. Demolition had just begun when the 1929 stockmarket crash hit. Plans for the building were postponed and the lot was unused for nearly forty years.

On 23 February 1967, James Richardson and Sons re-announced that they would build a headquarters at Portage and Main. Designed by Smith Carter Searle and Associates, with Skidmore, Owings and Merrill as consulting architects, it was completed in 1969 and still serves as the headquarters of James Richardson & Sons, Limited. The original cost estimate for the building was $29 million.

Excavation of the site began 19 October 1967. In order to support the skyscraper, the construction involved augering through  of clay above the granite boulders and limestone bedrock underneath the location to install caissons. The topping-off ceremony was held on 4 November 1968, when the final concrete was poured on the top level.

Operations

As of 1981, the skyscraper held a working population of approximately 3,000. The building had 43,758 light bulbs and approximately 500 sinks and toilets and was managed by 150 operations staff. Operational costs of the building at the time included a monthly electricity bill of as much as $40,000, $110,000/year heating, $20,000/year water, and $1 million/year real estate tax, as well as a $500,000/year cleaning budget, which included 83 cleaning staff.
Waste management of the skyscraper featured  daily trash disposal, which was funneled to a compactor in the basement and picked up daily. Exterior management included window cleaning for four days in each April and October. Air conditioners for the building operate from two floors, the 4th and 32nd. Two such machines on the 32nd floor weigh  and  each. They are flanked by a pair of 500-horsepower boilers which were fueled by natural gas, but could be transitioned to oil for days of extreme cold. In case of emergency, the building had fire hoses on each floor, and a high-powered pump in the basement, as well as a  emergency water supply on the 34th floor and a diesel generator for emergency lighting.

Shortly after opening, the 31st floor was reserved as an Observation Deck where Winnipeggers could view the city and on a clear day see the Selkirk Water Tower.

Public artwork

In 2000, a bronze sculpture by Leo Mol was unveiled in the Richardson Plaza alongside the Richardson Building. The sculpture depicts children on an oak tree, and was commissioned by Hartley Richardson. It weighs almost . At the time it was the largest sculpture Mol had produced.

In 2012, a sculpture by Ivan Eyre was installed as a permanent display outside the Richardson Building. The Winnipeg artist's piece is title North Watch, and depicts a man and his devoted dog.

Renovation

Through 2010 and 2011, the shopping concourse below the building was renovated as part of a larger $10-million project that included work the former Bank of Canada Building at 161 Portage Ave and the Lombard Avenue parkade. The renovation included new granite flooring, new wall and ceiling coverings and a new conference centre. The renovation came approximately two years after a $3-million renovation of Winnipeg Square, an adjoining underground shopping centre.

See also
List of tallest buildings in Winnipeg

External links 
 Construction Photos on University of Manitoba's building index
 Richardson Building at Emporis buildings

References

Modernist architecture in Canada
Headquarters in Canada
Skyscrapers in Winnipeg
Office buildings completed in 1969
Skyscraper office buildings in Canada
Skidmore, Owings & Merrill buildings
James Richardson & Sons
Buildings and structures in downtown Winnipeg